Niclas Vest Kirkeløkke (born 26 March 1994) is a Danish handball player for Rhein-Neckar Löwen and the Danish national team.

Career
Niclas Kirkeløkke is the son of Gun-Britt Kirkeløkke who played many matches on the youth and junior national team in the early 1980s. Gun-Britt twin sister, Gun-Maj, also played 25 A-national matches from 1985 to 1987. Niclas Kirkeløkke began his handball career in Risøhøj Håndbold, before making the move to GOG at the age of 11.

In 2012 he was moved up to the senior team of GOG. He participated in the 2013 Men's Youth World Handball Championship, winning the tournament by beating Croatia and was named on the all-star team.

Individual awards
All-Star Right back of the Youth World Championship: 2013

References

External links

1994 births
Danish male handball players
Living people
People from Faaborg-Midtfyn Municipality
Expatriate handball players
Danish expatriate sportspeople in Germany
Rhein-Neckar Löwen players
Handball-Bundesliga players
Sportspeople from the Region of Southern Denmark